The DGCOS (Double-Glazing & Conservatory Ombudsman Scheme) is an independent UK regulatory body, whose agenda includes vetting of suppliers, guaranteeing customer access to industry inspectors, and protecting members against unfounded complaints.

Background 
The DGCOS, or Double-Glazing & Conservatory Ombudsman Scheme, was established in early 2010 to provide an independent regulatory body for UK’s double glazing and conservatory industry.

The DGCOS was launched in May 2010 with the backing of consumer advocate Nick Ross – a former presenter of BBC's consumer programme Watchdog (TV series).

The UK's double glazing and conservatory sector
The Double Glazing and Conservatory Industry in the UK is large, with 14,000 window, door and conservatory companies operating.

An investigation by consumer magazine Which? indicated that the UK's double glazing industry had a lack of transparency regarding prices, acknowledging the importance of the industry ensuring that all traders were reputable.

Vetting standards

DGCOS ensures all member businesses have gone through a 12-point vetting process which includes:
 submitting references of 10 jobs completed in the past 12 months
 submitting 3 supplier references
 ensuring professional contracts, terms & conditions and written guarantees are in place
 that they offer insurance backed guarantees for at least 10 years
 ensure the installer has a professional complaints process with nominated complaints handler
 that they are fully covered with public liability insurance

DGCOS is an independent organisation paid for by installers and does not charge consumers.

Benefits
Consumers 
 a free quote for a DGCOS member
 an information pack which explains the protections offered by the scheme
 Free Comprehensive written guarantee
 Free Deposit Protection
 Free Insurance-Backed Guarantee (to underwrite the guarantee if the installer ceases to trade)
 Free access to industry inspectors, mediators and an ombudsman (where all decisions are legally binding & enforceable)

Traders
Protection to its members' businesses in situations where customers withhold payments or make unfounded complaints, allowing them to claim for unpaid contracts in cases where the Ombudsman has found in favour of the installer and the customer refuses to pay
Installers are given marketing and point of sale materials to assist them gaining new clients.
Back office management systems to automatically produce guarantees / comply with building control regulations
Ongoing performance analysis to enable installers to monitor their performance in 8 key areas.

The Consumer Protection Report

DGCOS commissioned a new report into the double-glazing industry. The Consumer Protection Report is deeply critical of continuing failures in consumer protection. Most of the schemes have flaws and many of the reassuring logos used by double-glazing companies are simply labels for trade associations rather than formal warranty schemes like ABTA. People paying for double-glazing or conservatories still need to be on their guard against poor or worthless guarantees.

Even in recession-hit 2009, homeowners in Great Britain spent £3.17 billion on maintaining and improving their homes with double glazing and conservatories. The report details the actual levels of protection enjoyed by homeowners who buy windows, doors and conservatories, in contrast to the protection they think they have from the large numbers of organisations that offer it. David Herman’s recommendations will provide a blueprint for consumer protection bodies and key questions for homeowners to ask before buying double glazing or conservatories.

Report Findings

 At least 20 different schemes operate in the sector with widely differing levels of protection
 “A badge or letterhead showing that an installing firm is a member of a consumer protection organisation may not necessarily mean that all its customers are protected and the scope of protection varies wildly. This is true of most organisations with some notable exceptions.”
 “The protection is thus only as good as the services offered by the consumer protection organisation or trade association. It also depends on which organisation/s the installing company chooses to become a member of. To further complicate matters, many installers have discretion as to whether or not to offer some or all of the protection available.”
 Insurance-backed guarantees (IBG) are a key part of consumer protection but very few organisations make it an obligation for their members to provide every customer with one. Also the level of cover can be limited because of restricted terms and conditions by the insurer, which often leaves the consumer without protection.
 When things go wrong there is a “black hole” in dealing with disputes.
 Many of the organisations are trade associations set up for the benefit of their members (the installers) but which offer some form/s of consumer protection. Others are deposit protection and insurance backed guarantee providers or facilitators of building regulations’ compliance that have added other consumer services, although these may not be obvious from the name.
 A number of organisations say they require their members to provide consumers with deposit protection or an insurance backed guarantee for example, but it is unclear how many members comply with this obligation or indeed how the organisation would ensure that they do.
 One organisation, DGCOS, has been set up specifically to plug these gaps and provide a comprehensive consumer protection service.

Notes

External links

BBC News, 04/05/2010, 'Ombudsman to tackle rogue glaziers', http://news.bbc.co.uk/1/hi/uk/8658917.stm
The Guardian, 23/06/2010, 'Major window firms attacked for 'misleading' public', https://www.theguardian.com/money/2010/jun/23/window-firms-misleading-public
The Independent, 09/05/2010, 'Tide turns in fight against the rogue double glazers' https://www.independent.co.uk/money/spend-save/tide-turns-in-fight-against-the-rogue-double-glazers-1968949.html
Crain's Manchester Business, 05/05/2010, 'New double glazing ombudsman opens office in Manchester', https://web.archive.org/web/20100508201840/http://www.crainsmanchesterbusiness.co.uk/article/20100505/FREE/100509959
Manchester Evening News, 04/05/2010, 'Don't Have Nightmares About Double Glazing', http://menmedia.co.uk/news/business/s/1238767_dont_have_nightmares_about_double_glazing 
Lancashire Evening Post, 05/06/2010, 'Conservatory firm customers will not lose money', http://www.lep.co.uk/news/conservatory_firm_customers_will_not_lose_money_1_63870
Northwest Evening Mail, 14/06/2010, 'Consumer Champ Backs New Scheme, https://web.archive.org/web/20121009005405/http://www.nwemail.co.uk/news/action-desk/consumer-champ-backs-new-scheme-1.720280?referrerPath=news%2Faction-desk

Consumer protection in the United Kingdom
Energy conservation in the United Kingdom
Ombudsmen in the United Kingdom